Lycopsis is an extinct genus of South American metatherian, that lived during the Miocene in Argentina and Colombia.

History 
Although not named until 1927, Florentino Ameghino described a species now seen as synonymous with Lycopsis torresi, Anatherium oxyrhynchus, in 1895 based on a mandibular ramus with several teeth. The fossil was recovered from Puesto Estancia La Costa in Santa Cruz, Argentina, dating to the Miocene. The type material of Lycopsis was collected in July 1895 by "C. Berry" from the middle Miocene strata of the Santa Cruz Formation along the Santa Cruz River in the same area. The fossils (MLP 11-113) were fragmentary, constituting only several fragmentary jaw sections from the maxilla and mandible, including several molars. However, these fossils weren't named until in 1927, Angelo Cabrera named Lycopsis torresi, the generic name meaning "wolf-like aspect" after the anatomy of the mandible and the specific name after Argentine paleontologist and the director of the Museo de la Plata at the time, Luis Maria Torres.

Taxonomy 

The cladogram after the analysis of Suárez et al., 2015, looks as follows:

Distribution 
Fossils of Lycopsis have been found in:
 Arroyo Chasicó Formation and Santa Cruz Formations, Argentina
 Honda Group, Colombia

References 

Sparassodonts
Burdigalian first appearances
Tortonian extinctions
Miocene mammals of South America
Chasicoan
Mayoan
Laventan
Colloncuran
Friasian
Santacrucian
Neogene Argentina
Fossils of Argentina
Neogene Colombia
Fossils of Colombia
Honda Group, Colombia
Fossil taxa described in 1927
Prehistoric mammal genera